Fairfield-Suisun Unified School District is a public school district based in Solano County, California, and a portion of Napa County, California.

High schools

Angelo Rodriguez High School

Armijo High School

Fairfield High School

Sem Yeto High School

References

External links
 

School districts in Solano County, California